This is a list of Czech animated films made in the Czech lands from 1927 to the present. After 1930, many Czech animated films were produced with sound, and after 1947 most were produced in color. The list is ordered by year of release.

References

Lists of animated films
animated